Jann-Fiete Arp (born 6 January 2000), known as Fiete Arp, is a German professional footballer who plays as a forward for 2. Bundesliga club Holstein Kiel. He has also represented Germany at youth international level.

Arp began his football career with his hometown club, SV Wahlstedt, before joining Hamburger SV's youth system at U11 level. He broke through to the first team in 2017, and earned a move to Bayern Munich ahead of the 2019–20 season. Struggling to make an impact, Arp was sent on loan to 2. Bundesliga club Holstein Kiel in June 2021, he later signed permanently with the club in 2022.

He has gained five caps for the Germany U19 team, scoring two goals.

Club career

Early career
Arp was born in Bad Segeberg, Schleswig-Holstein and grew up with his separated parents in Bad Segeberg and nearby Wahlstedt. At the age of 4, he started playing football at SV Wahlstedt. His first major success was winning the 2008 Gothia Cup with the U11 team of the Segeberg District Football Association.

For the 2010–11 season, Arp moved to the Hamburger SV youth academy, where he initially played with the U11 team. In the 2015–16 and 2016–17 seasons, Arp scored 36 goals in a total of 44 appearances in the Under 17 Bundesliga and was the top scorer of the North/Northeast group with 26 goals in the 2016–17 season. During the winter break of the 2016–17 season, Arp was included with the Hamburger SV first team under head coach Markus Gisdol. In the second half of the season, in parallel to appearances in the U17 league – he also appeared in the Under 19 Bundesliga, in which he scored 2 goals in 4 appearances by the end of the season. For his achievements, Arp received the golden Fritz Walter Medal in the U17 age group in July 2017.

Hamburger SV
Ahead of the 2017–18 season, Arp was included in the first-team squad besides being part of the U19, for which he was still eligible to play for two more seasons. He signed a contract extension until 30 June 2019 before the season and completed the summer training camp with the professionals. After pre-season, he again mainly took part in U19 practice, as he could only train once a week with the professionals because of his upcoming Abitur, which he completed at the Gymnasium Heidberg. Nevertheless, after scoring seven goals in three games in the Under 19 Bundesliga, manager Markus Gisdol called him up for the matchday squad for the first time for the Nordderby against rivals Werder Bremen on 30 September 2017. Arp made his debut in the game, coming on as an 89th-minute substitute for Bobby Wood. This made him the first Bundesliga player born in the 2000s.

On 28 October 2017, Arp scored his first Bundesliga goal against Hertha BSC, thus becoming the first Bundesliga player born in the 2000s to score a goal. At age 17 and 295 days, he became the Hamburger SV senior team's youngest goalscorer ever and the seventh-youngest goalscorer in Bundesliga history. On the following matchday, Arp was in the starting line-up for the first time in the 3–1 win over VfB Stuttgart and scored the final goal of the match. Afterwards, Arp was considered one of Germany's greatest striker talents and an upcoming national team player. In the further course of the season, Arp could not build on these achievements under Gisdol's successors Bernd Hollerbach and Christian Titz, who had already coached him in the U17. He lost his starting spot due to high school exams and after catching some common colds. In total, Arp made 18 Bundesliga appearances and two goals that season, alongside and five appearances and seven goals for the U19, who finished runner-up in the North/Northeast division. With the first-team, however, he suffered relegation to the 2. Bundesliga—the first time in history that HSV would not be present in the Bundesliga.

Before the 2018–19 season, now 18-year-old Arp extended his contract with HSV until 30 June 2020. At the beginning of February 2019, it became known that an agreement had been reached with Bayern Munich, which contained a "flexible transfer period". The date of the official move — 1 July 2019 or 1 July 2020 — would be determined by Arp himself. At the beginning of the season, Arp was the third striker on the depth chart behind Pierre-Michel Lasogga and Manuel Wintzheimer and was not in the matchday squad on the first few matchdays, but made three appearances for the reserves in the fourth-tier Regionalliga Nord, scoring three goals. Arp made his first appearance of the season for the first team in the first round of the DFB-Pokal in a 5–3 victory against fifth-tier club TuS Erndtebrück, where he contributed with a goal. Under manager Titz, Arp subsequently made four league appearances, with two of them being in the starting eleven. After Hannes Wolf took over the reigns at the end of October 2018, Arp continued mostly as a substitute, and appeared as a left winger, while Lasogga and Hwang Hee-chan were given preference at the striker position. In the second half of the season, Arp remained in the reserve role. He appeared as a substitute on six occasions and only made one start in his last HSV game, with the team already out of a direct promotion spot.

Bayern Munich
On 7 February 2019, it was announced that Arp would join Bayern Munich at the beginning of either the 2019–20 season or the 2020–21 season. He ultimately joined Bayern Munich on 1 July 2019. At the beginning of the season, now 19-year-old Arp was mostly not included matchday squad, as head coach Niko Kovač preferred second-team strikers Kwasi Okyere Wriedt and Joshua Zirkzee as backups to undisputed starter Robert Lewandowski. Therefore, Arp made his first competitive appearance for the club for the reserves in the 3. Liga. At the end of September, he suffered a scaphoid bone fracture during practice and had to undergo surgery. During the international break in November, Arp returned to first-team practice under Kovač's successor Hansi Flick, but two days later during practice he suffered a radial bone injury which sidelined him for the remained of the first half of the season. During his absence, the one year younger striker Zirkzee was promoted to the professional team by Flick scored two goals in two substitutions. Arp rejoined the team for the winter training camp in Doha. In early February, he was removed from the UEFA Champions League squad for the knockout phase for winter transfer window newcomer Álvaro Odriozola. After the winter break, Arp was behind Wriedt, Zirkzee and Leon Dajaku on the depth chart for the reserves under head coach Sebastian Hoeneß. The season was subsequently interrupted due to the COVID-19 pandemic. After the resumption of play, Arp made a few more appearances for the reserves before injuring himself as he scored his third season goal for the team, once again sidelining him for some games. Arp finished the season with 3 goals in 12 appearances as Bayern Munich II became 3. Liga champions.

After a disappointing first season in which he failed to make a single Bundesliga appearance, Arp was made a permanent member of the club's secondary team in order to receive more playing time. In October, he nevertheless made his first-team debut in the first team when he was substituted in the final phase of the postponed DFB-Pokal first-round match against 1. FC Düren. He also benefited from the fact that numerous Bayern internationals had been on international duties the day before and were therefore not called up by Flick. Thus, in the 3–0 victory, only outfielders of the reserves and U19 were available as replacements. After the game, however, Flick stated: "For him, it is important that he has a home. And his home is currently the U23s". For the reserves, Arp was initially a regular starter under new head coach Holger Seitz, but had to settle for a role as substitute behind Lenn Jastremski at times. After the managerial duo of Danny Schwarz and Martín Demichelis had taken over the relegation-threatened reserves for the last 8 games of the season, Armindo Sieb was the preferred starter in attack. Arp made 30 appearances in the 3. Liga for the 2020–21 season, in which he scored 5 goals, as Bayern Munich II relegated to the Regionalliga Bayern. He made only the one cup appearance for the first team.

Loan to Holstein Kiel
On 25 June 2021, Arp returned to his native Schleswig-Holstein to join Holstein Kiel on a season-long loan. At the beginning of the season, Arp featured as the starting striker in manager Ole Werner's 4–3–3 formation. He scored in the first round of the DFB-Pokal against the Regionalliga club SC Weiche Flensburg 08 and in the 3–0 victory on matchday five against Erzgebirge Aue. The team, which in the 2020–21 season still reached promotion play-offs, saw themselves in a relegation battle after a poor start. Manager Werner announced his resignation after the seventh matchday, with the team 15th in the league table. Under the new head coach Marcel Rapp, Arp was pushed out of the starting eleven by Benedikt Pichler, who had only joined the team after the start of the season. While his Austrian rival scored 6 goals before the winter break and became the team's top goalscorer, Arp was only used as a substitute and remained goalless. In January 2022, the club signed his former Bayern teammate and fellow striker Kwasi Okyere Wriedt.

Holstein Kiel
On 1 July 2022, Arp signed permanently with Holstein Kiel on a free transfer. He penned a two-year deal.

International career
Arp was part of the German U17 team in May 2017, scoring seven goals in the 2017 UEFA European Under-17 Championship to finish second on the top goalscorers list behind Amine Gouiri. In one of the games, he scored a perfect hat-trick in a record time of 13 minutes against Bosnia and Herzegovina U17.

Later that year, in October 2017, Arp played in the 2017 FIFA U-17 World Cup in India, where he scored five goals. In total, Arp scored 18 goals in 19 appearances for the U17 team.

From November 2018 to March 2019, Arp was active for the German U19 team, where he scored 2 goals in 5 games.

Career statistics

Honours
Bayern Munich
Bundesliga: 2019–20
DFB-Pokal: 2019–20
UEFA Champions League: 2019–20
UEFA Super Cup: 2020
DFL-Supercup: 2020

Bayern Munich II
3. Liga: 2019–20

Individual
 Fritz Walter Medal U17 Gold: 2017
Hamburger SV Young Player of the Season: 2017–18

References

External links

 
 

2000 births
Living people
People from Segeberg
Footballers from Schleswig-Holstein
German footballers
Germany youth international footballers
Association football forwards
Hamburger SV players
FC Bayern Munich footballers
Holstein Kiel players
Bundesliga players
2. Bundesliga players